The Great Books Foundation, incorporated in the state of Illinois and based in Chicago, is an independent, nonprofit educational organization whose mission is to help people think and share ideas. Toward this end, the Foundation publishes collections of classic and modern literature as part of a continuum of reading and discussion programs for children and adults. The foundation has two main programs: Junior Great Books, serving students in kindergarten through high school, and Great Books Discussion for college students, continuing education, and Great Books book groups. The organization derives its income from the sale of books, teacher professional development fees, contributions, and grants.

Established in 1947 by a group of prominent citizens led by University of Chicago Chancellor Robert Maynard Hutchins and Mortimer Adler, the Great Books Foundation began as a grassroots movement to promote continuing liberal education for the general public. In 1960 the Foundation extended its mission to children with the introduction of Junior Great Books. Since its inception, the Foundation has helped thousands of people throughout the U.S. and in foreign countries begin their own discussion groups in schools, libraries, and community centers. Since 2001, the Foundation has published the quarterly magazine The Common Review.

Great Books discussions use a distinctive discussion method called "Shared Inquiry", in which the leader starts with an open-ended question about the meaning of a selection and then asks follow-up questions to help participants develop their ideas. Developed by the Great Books Foundation, Shared Inquiry is related to Socratic discussion but is distinguished by the fact that the basic discussion question is one to which the leader does not know the answer.

Sixty years after Adler co-founded the Great Books Foundation, it continues to embrace his insistence that the civil discussion of challenging ideas is a powerful source of personal growth and social engagement. Despite a common misconception to the contrary, the foundation promotes the reading and discussion of great literature wherever it is found, including literature by outstanding contemporary authors, women authors, and authors from all over the world.

See also
 Great Books
 Western canon
 St. John's College (Annapolis/Santa Fe)
 Shimer College
 Harrison Middleton University

References

External links
 Official website
 Organizational Profile – National Center for Charitable Statistics (Urban Institute)

Educational foundations in the United States
Book promotion
Non-profit organizations based in Chicago
Organizations established in 1947
1947 establishments in Illinois